The TM-62 is a Soviet anti-tank blast mine made in many variants. It has a central fuze and typically a  explosive charge, but the variants vary greatly in detail. The mine can be laid manually or automatically from a mine laying machine including the PMR-1, PMR-2 wheeled towed mine layers, the GMZ-3 tracked mine laying vehicle and the VMR-2 helicopter mine laying system. The TM-62 can be fitted with the same fuzes as the TM-72, which include MVN-72 and MVN-80 fuzes which are vibration and magnetism sensitive.

In a static test, the TM-62M proved capable of penetrating the hull of a Centurion tank, killing the simulated crew of animals inside. The mine was used in the 2022 Russian invasion of Ukraine where Ukrainian civilians helped to clear the mines from roads.

Variants
 TM-62M, with a circular metal case. It is the most widely employed variant.
 TM-62B, with a paper or cardboard case, basically a block of cast explosive with a fuze set into the center.
 TM-62D, with a wooden case.
 TM-62P, TM-62P2 and TM-62P3, with plastic cases. The TM-62P and TM-62P2 mine cases have ribbed sides, whereas the TM-62P3 has a smooth casing.
 TM-62T, with a fabric and epoxy casing and a central fuze.

Fuzes
 MVZ-62
 MVCh-62, with a clockwork arming delay of 30 to 120 seconds.
 MVN-62
 MVN-72, with a combination of electronics and clockwork, after an initial arming delay the magnetic influence fuze is enabled, powered by a 1.5 V battery.
 MVN-80, an improved version of the MVN-72.
 VM-62Z 
 MVP-62, with a pneumatic bellows arming delay of 20 to 300 seconds. The delay mechanism uses a minimum of metal making it difficult to detect when used with one of the minimum metal cases.
 MVP-62M
 ZN-97, a magnetic influence fuze made in Poland.

Magnetic influence fuzes provide full-width attack, i.e. any part of the target vehicle passing over the mine will trigger detonation, not just the track or wheels. However, since magnetic fuzes are electronic, their operational life relies on battery power. Ultimately the battery will run down, after which the mine no longer functions. In contrast, a purely mechanical fuze (usually triggered via a belleville spring) gives a much longer operational life e.g. mines planted 50 years previously will still detonate if a target vehicle drives over them.

Specifications (TM-62M with MVZ-62 fuze)
 Weight: 
 Explosive content:  of TNT (although sometimes combinations of RDX/TNT/Aluminium or Amatol mixes are used)
 Diameter: 
 Height: 
 Operating pressure:

Users

References
 Jane's Mines and Mine Clearance 2005-2006

See also
TM-46 anti-tank landmine

Anti-tank mines
Cold War weapons of the Soviet Union